Fan Jiachen (born 21 February 1988) is a Chinese competitor in synchronized swimming.

She won 2 silver medals at the 2011 World Aquatics Championships. She was also a reserve for the gold-winning Chinese team at the 2010 Asian Games.

Personal life
Fan Jiachen married footballer Zhu Yifan in 2014.

References
 Profile

Living people
Chinese synchronized swimmers
1988 births
World Aquatics Championships medalists in synchronised swimming
Synchronized swimmers from Beijing
Artistic swimmers at the 2010 Asian Games
Asian Games medalists in artistic swimming
Synchronized swimmers at the 2011 World Aquatics Championships
Asian Games gold medalists for China
Medalists at the 2010 Asian Games